A.K.G. is a 2007 Malayalam-language historical drama film, directed by Shaji N Karun, starring P. Sreekumar and Krishna Kumar in the lead roles. It is based on the political and personal life of communist leader A.K. Gopalan. The film was edited by Mahesh Narayanan, who had replaced B. Ajithkumar due to scheduling issues.

Lonappan Nambadan, who at the time was a Member of Parliament, played the role of the West Bengal communist leader Jyoti Basu. E.K. Nayanar was played by his son Krishna Kumar. Anirudhan Sampath portrayed the role of his father K. Aniruddhan.

Speaker of the Lok Sabha Somnath Chatterjee and CPI(M) general secretary Prakash Karat spoke at a Delhi screening of the film.

Cast
 P Sreekumar as AKG
 Krishna Kumar as E.K. Nayanar
 Jayadevan	
 Anirudhan Sampath as K. Aniruddhan
 Adv Vijaya Kumar
 Archana	
 Ashish Varma	
 Dr M. P. Parameswaran as E. M. S. Namboodiripad
 J Aparna
 Raveendran Kodakkadu	
 Shubha Sharma	
 Viswambharan	
 Punathil Kunjabdulla as C. H. Muhammad Koya
 Lonappan Nambadan as Jyoti Basu

References

2007 films
2000s Malayalam-language films